Grain de sable (Grain of Sand) is the third album by Tryo, it was released in June 2003. There should have been another song on this album which in the end was taken off; the song "COGEMA" did not appear on Grain de sable. But the song in question does appear on the live CD De Bouches à Oreilles with the name "co j'ai marre" and it has a video on the DVD Tryo au Cabaret Sauvage.

This album got the Group Award at the Grand Prix du Disque for French Song in 2004.

Track listing 
 "G8" - 2:51
 "Sortez-les" - 3:46
 "Comme les journées sont longues" - 3:24
 "Pompafric" - 3:48
 "Si la vie m'a mis là" - 5:36
 "Dans les nuages" - 4:17
 "Monsieur Bibendum" - 2:42
 "Serre moi" - 3:46
 "Ta réalité" - 3:47
 "Récréation" - 3:24
 "Ballade en forêt" -4:06
 "Désolé pour hier soir" - 3:39
 "Pas pareil" - 3:37
 "Apocalypticodramatic" - 3:46
 "J'ai un but" - 3:49

Credits
Manu (Vocals, guitar)
Guizmo (Vocals, guitar)
Mali (Vocals, guitar)
Daniel (percussion)

References

2003 albums
Tryo albums